Coleophora pokrovkella is a moth of the family Coleophoridae. It lives in the southern Ural Mountains in Russia.

The wingspan is 14.5-15.5 mm. Adults have a white head with a pale buff hue. The thorax is white with light buff dorsal and subdorsal stripes. The forewings are buff. Males have brown scales forming dots and stripes in the apical part. The fringes are white with a pale beige tinge. The hindwings are light grey with pale beige fringes, although these are white towards the apex.

Etymology
The specific name alludes to the vicinity of the village of Pokrovka, where the holotype to the new taxon was collected.

References

pokrovkella
Moths described in 2007
Moths of Europe